Evan Spencer (born May 26, 1993) is a former American football wide receiver. He played college football at Ohio State. He was originally drafted by the Washington Redskins in the sixth round of the 2015 NFL Draft.

College career

Ohio State Buckeyes
Spencer is well known for the touchdown pass he threw to Michael Thomas on a trick play going into half time in the 2015 Sugar Bowl vs. Alabama. This touchdown helped give the underdog Buckeyes the momentum and eventually beat Alabama 42-35. Later in the game he threw a key block on the game clinching 85 yard TD, the longest run given up by Alabama that year.   The Buckeyes advanced to the national championship game where they defeated Oregon to win the first College Football Playoff National championship 42-20.

Professional career

Washington Redskins
Spencer was selected by the Washington Redskins with the 187th overall pick in the 2015 NFL Draft. He signed a four-year contract on May 11, 2015. On September 5, he was waived/injured during final roster cuts before the start of the regular season. He was placed on the team's injured reserve after going unclaimed on waivers. On September 9, the Redskins released Spencer with an injury settlement.

Tampa Bay Buccaneers
The Tampa Bay Buccaneers signed Spencer to their practice squad on September 22, 2015. This united him with his father, Tim, who at the time was the Buccaneers' running back coach.

He was promoted to the active roster on December 22, 2015. On September 6, 2016, he was released by the Buccaneers. Two days later, he was signed to the Buccaneers' practice squad.

On September 9, 2016, Spencer was placed on the reserve/retired list.

Personal
Spencer is the youngest son of retired NFL running back Tim Spencer. Spencer's older brother, Cole, is an area scout with the Washington Redskins. During the 2015 NFL Draft, Cole called on behalf of the Redskins to tell his younger brother that he was going to be drafted.

References

External links
Ohio State Buckeyes bio
Washington Redskins bio

1993 births
Living people
American football wide receivers
Ohio State Buckeyes football players
People from Vernon Hills, Illinois
Players of American football from Illinois
Sportspeople from the Chicago metropolitan area
Tampa Bay Buccaneers players
Washington Redskins players